A Dash Through the Clouds is a 1912 short American silent comedy film directed by Mack Sennett, written by Dell Henderson and starring Mabel Normand. It has the distinction of being somewhat of an aviation film as Sennett employed the services of real life aviation pioneer, Philip Parmelee, a pilot for the Wright Brothers. The film provided a means through which Parmelee is preserved, as he died in a crash not long after the making.

Sennett had a penchant for working with and showcasing real-life daredevils and public personalities and hired a real-life pilot, Phil Parmelee, who was a national hero at the time. He would employ Barney Oldfield in a similar fashion a year later in Barney Oldfield's Race for a Life.

Cast
Mabel Normand - Martha
Fred Mace - Arthur (aka 'Chubby')
Philip Parmelee - Slim, the aviator
Sylvia Ashton - Carmelita, Young Mexican Woman
Jack Pickford - Mexican boy who warns Chubby
Kate Bruce - Old Mexican Woman

other cast
William J. Butler - Townsman
Edward Dillon - Carmelita's Objecting Relative
Charles Gorman - Townsman
Grace Henderson - Townswoman
Harry Hyde - Townsman
J. Jiquel Lanoe - Townsman
Alfred Paget - Townsman

References

External links

A Dash Through the Clouds available for free download at Internet Archive

1912 films
1912 short films
American silent short films
Biograph Company films
Films directed by Mack Sennett
American aviation films
American black-and-white films
Silent American comedy films
1912 comedy films
Articles containing video clips
American comedy short films
1910s American films